The 1970 Milan–San Remo was the 61st edition of the Milan–San Remo cycle race and was held on 19 March 1970. The race started in Milan and finished in San Remo. The race was won by Michele Dancelli of the Molteni team.

General classification

References

1970
1970 in road cycling
1970 in Italian sport
1970 Super Prestige Pernod